Hiroshima is the capital of Hiroshima Prefecture and the largest city in the Chūgoku region, Japan.

Hiroshima may also refer to:

 Atomic bombings of Hiroshima and Nagasaki
 Hiroshima (book), a 1946 book written by John Hersey
 Hiroshima (1953 film), a 1953 Japanese film about the bombing of Hiroshima and its aftermath
 Hiroshima (1995 film), a 1995 Japanese-Canadian film about the bombing of Hiroshima
 Hiroshima: BBC History of World War II, a 2005 television documentary
 Hiroshima (band), an American jazz band formed in 1974
 "Hiroshima" (song), a song by Dave Morgan and recorded by Wishful Thinking in 1971 and Sandra in 1990
 Hiroshima – Rising from the Abyss, a 2001 album by Toshiko Akiyoshi - Lew Tabackin Big Band
 "Hiroshima", a song by Ben Folds
 "Hiroshima", a song by Bjorn Afzelius
 Hiroshima (Mazda factory), an automobile manufacturing complex in Aki, Hiroshima
 Hiroshima Prefecture, in the Chūgoku region on Honshu island